Leith is one of the seventeen wards used to elect members of the City of Edinburgh Council. Established in 2007 along with the other wards, it currently elects three councillors.

Its territory is located north-east of the city centre bounded by the coast on the Firth of Forth, pertaining to the heart of the port and former independent burgh of Leith (outer parts of which fall into other wards). In 2019, the ward had a population of 24,207.

Councillors

Election Results

2022 Election
2022 City of Edinburgh Council election

2017 Election
2017 City of Edinburgh Council election

2012 Election
2012 City of Edinburgh Council election

2007 Election
2007 City of Edinburgh Council election

References

External links
Listed Buildings in Leith Ward, City of Edinburgh at British Listed Buildings

Wards of Edinburgh
Leith